Peter T. Demos (July 18, 1918 – September 18, 2012) was a professor in the Department of Physics and the Laboratory for Nuclear Science at MIT.  A native of Peterborough, Ontario, Demos attended Peterborough Collegiate and Vocational School and Queen's University, and received a Ph.D. in Physics from MIT in 1951.  He was a founder and former director of the Bates Linear Accelerator at MIT and served as advisor on nuclear science to John F. Kennedy.

Work

References 

1918 births
2012 deaths
Massachusetts Institute of Technology School of Science faculty
MIT Department of Physics alumni
Canadian emigrants to the United States